"Grim Reaper of Love" is a single by the American rock band the Turtles, released in May 1966. It was written by Turtles members Chuck Portz and Al Nichol, and includes sections in quintuple meter (3-2 on the opening verse).
It is an early example of psychedelic raga rock, using an electric sitar.

References

1966 singles
Raga rock songs
The Turtles songs
1966 songs